Comet McMillan  or 208P/McMillan is a periodic comet with an orbital period of about 8.1 years. The comet belongs to the Jupiter family of comets. It last came to perihelion on 1 July 2016.

Discovery 
The comet was discovered on 19 October 2008 by the American astronomer Robert S. McMillan. It then received the designation P/2008 U1. In December, S. Nakano link to this comet that was observed as early as in October 2000 and gave it the designation P/2000 S7.

References

External links 
 JPL Simulation 
 McMillan's profile by Seiichi Yoshida
 Orbital elements by Seiichi Yoshida
 Jupiter family of Comets

Periodic comets
0208